Ptychopseustis is a genus of moths of the family Crambidae.

Species
Ptychopseustis amoenella (Snellen, 1880)
Ptychopseustis argentisparsalis (Hampson, 1896)
Ptychopseustis calamochroa (Hampson, 1919)
Ptychopseustis conisphoralis (Hampson, 1919)
Ptychopseustis eutacta (Turner, 1908)
Ptychopseustis fuscivenalis (Hampson, 1896)
Ptychopseustis ictericalis (Swinhoe, 1886)
Ptychopseustis impar (Warren & Rothschild, 1905)
Ptychopseustis lucipara Mey, 2011
Ptychopseustis molybdogramma (Hampson, 1919)
Ptychopseustis pallidochrealis Yamanaka, 2004
Ptychopseustis plumbeolinealis (Hampson, 1896)
Ptychopseustis schmitzi Mey, 2011
Ptychopseustis undulalis (Hampson, 1919)

References

Natural History Museum Lepidoptera genus database

Cybalomiinae
Crambidae genera
Taxa named by Edward Meyrick